This is a list of career statistics of the former professional Czech tennis player Barbora Strýcová since her professional debut in 2002.

Career achievements
In her career, Strýcová won two singles titles, and 30 doubles titles on the WTA Tour, plus one Grand Slam doubles title at the 2019 Wimbledon Championships, partnering with Hsieh Su-wei. On ITF Circuit, she won nine singles titles, and ten doubles titles. As a part of Czech Fed Cup team, Strýcová won six titles, but in only three of them played in the finals.

Year-end championships
In doubles, Strýcová debut at the WTA Finals, in 2018, where she was stopped in semifinals. Year later, in 2019, Strýcová together with Hsieh Su-wei reached final at the WTA Finals, where they lost against Tímea Babos-Kristina Mladenovic.

Grand Slam championships
Strýcová reached two Grand Slam finals, with score of 1–1 win-loss. The first final that she reached was at the 2019 Wimbledon Championships, where she won the title alongside Hsieh Su-wei. In 2020, she reached her second Grand Slam final, at the Australian Open, but ended runner-up.

Barbora also reached a total of six semifinals, five in doubles and one in singles. Semifinal in singles was in 2019 at Wimbledon, where she lost against Serena Williams.

Performance timelines

Only main-draw results in WTA Tour, Grand Slam tournaments, Fed Cup/Billie Jean King Cup and Olympic Games are included in win–loss records.

Singles

Doubles

Mixed doubles

Significant finals

Grand Slam tournaments

Doubles: 2 (1 title, 1 runner-up)

Year-end championships finals

Doubles: 1 (1 runner–up)

Premier Mandatory/Premier-5 finals

Doubles: 12 (8 titles, 4 runner-ups)

Olympic medal matches

Doubles: 1 (bronze medal)

WTA career finals

Singles: 8 (2 titles, 6 runner-ups)

Doubles: 50 (31 titles, 19 runner-ups)

Team competition: 6 (6 titles)

ITF Circuit finals

Singles: 15 (9 titles, 6 runner–ups)

Doubles: 18 (10 titles, 8 runner–ups)

ITF Junior finals

Junior Grand Slam finals

Singles: 3 (2 titles, 1 runner-up)

Doubles: 4 (3 titles, 1 runner-up)

ITF Junior Circuit finals

Singles: 14 (4 titles, 10 runner–ups)

Career Grand Slam statistics

Seedings

Head-to-head records

Record against top 10 players
Strýcová's record against players who have been ranked in the top 10. Active players are in boldface.

Top 10 wins

Notes

References

External links 
 
 

Strýcová, Barbora